Subramania Nagar is a residential area within Madipakkam, a southern suburb of Chennai (formerly known as Madras), in Tamil Nadu, India.

Subramania Nagar is one oldest parts of Madipakkam. As early as 1975 people started settling down in this area. Before the settlements it used to be an area under agriculture.

Subramania Nagar Welfare Association indulge in social welfare activities for the whole nagar. 15 August, Independence Day is celebrated every year at Subramania Nagar First Street.

Bus Stop: Madipakkam Koot Road

Train Station: St. Thomas Mount

MRTS Station: Velachery

External links
 http://www.madipakkam.com/

Neighbourhoods in Chennai